Glasgow Tower (formerly known as the Millennium Tower) is a 127 metres (417 ft) free-standing landmark observation tower located on the south bank of the River Clyde in Glasgow, Scotland, and is part of the Glasgow Science Centre complex. It holds a Guinness World Record for being the tallest fully rotating freestanding structure in the world, in which the whole structure is capable of rotating 360 degrees.

After being closed in 2008 for refurbishments, the tower re-opened to the general public in July 2014, but as of December 2022, it is currently closed for more refurbishment work.

The Glasgow Tower is the tallest building in both Glasgow and Scotland, and has held these records since its completion in 2001.

Background and world records

At , the Glasgow Tower is currently the tallest tower in Scotland, and since late 2015, following the demolition of both the Red Road Flats and the Bluevale and Whitevale Towers, the structure is now the tallest building in all of Glasgow. It holds a Guinness World Record for being the tallest tower in the world in which the whole structure is capable of rotating 360 degrees. The whole structure originally rested upon a Nigerian-made  thrust bearing, but this was replaced with a phosphor-manganese-bronze alloy solid ball and cup bearing prior to a re-opening in 2014. This bearing rests at the bottom of a  caisson. The tower itself is not directly connected to these foundations, instead being supported by a ring of 24 rubber-sprung roller bearings at Podium level. This is to allow the building to rotate to face into the wind.

The tower has two lifts, each with a 12-person capacity, but for reasons of passenger comfort, this is limited to 6 guests plus a single member of staff. The lifts, manufactured by Alimak Hek, ascend the tower in two and a half minutes using a rack and pinion system, providing views to the rear of the tower through all-around glass windows. There is also an emergency staircase, comprising 523 stairs from the Cabin level to the Podium.

History and problems

The tower has been plagued by safety and engineering problems throughout its history. It missed its planned opening date in 2001. Problems with the Nigerian-made thrust bearing on which it rotates led to it being closed between February 2002 and August 2004. On 30 January 2005, ten people were trapped in the lifts and their rescue took over five hours. Following the incident, the tower re-opened on 21 December 2006.

In September 2007, a charity abseiling event was held on Glasgow Tower. The Centre stated that 65,000 people have climbed the tower during its periods of operation.

In August 2010, the tower closed again due to "technical issues stemming from its original design".

Prior to re-opening in 2014, the thrust bearing was replaced with a ball and cup bearing, and the partial fix was featured in the TV documentary "Incredible Engineering Blunders: Fixed".

The tower opened to the public again in July 2014, with new safety features and an updated interior. Three days after opening, a capacitor bank at the base encountered a fault, producing smoke which was misidentified as a fire.

The tower closed to the public once again in 2020, which was initially due to the coronavirus pandemic. The restrictions which forced the tower to close have since been lifted, but it is now undergoing refurbishment, and is currently planned to re-open in 2023.

Design
The tower is in the shape of an aerofoil (as if a symmetrical aircraft wing had been set in the ground vertically), with 4 manually-operated 6 kW motors to turn it into the wind in order to reduce wind resistance and improve stability through aerodynamic forces (wind split by the aerofoil applies an equal force to both sides of the structure, holding it in place). The tower, previously known as the Millennium Tower, was the winning design in an international competition to design a tower for the city centre of Glasgow. The original architectural design was by the architect Richard Horden, with engineering design by Buro Happold, but after commissioning the project was taken over by the Glasgow architects BDP. In the end, the tower cost £10 million. Glasgow City Council successfully sued contractors Carillion over the quality of the work.

"Tallest building" debate

Upon its completion in 2001, it became the second tallest self-supporting structure in Scotland, behind the Inverkip Power Station chimney. The website for the tower claims it is the "tallest freestanding building in Scotland".

See also
 Portsmouth's stylistically similar Spinnaker Tower, England's tallest building outside of London.

References

External links 
 
Photographs taken from the tower and of the tower
Online video showing the view from the tower
Time-lapse video of the tower rotating, as viewed from the base

Buildings and structures in Glasgow
Towers in Scotland
Tourist attractions in Glasgow
Buildings and structures completed in 2001
Govan
2001 establishments in Scotland
Skyscrapers in Glasgow
Observation towers in the United Kingdom